Sérgio da Rocha (born 21 October 1959) is a Brazilian prelate of the Catholic Church who has been the Archbishop of São Salvador da Bahia since 11 March 2020. Previously, he was the Archbishop of Brasília.

Biography
Rocha was born in Dobrada, Diocese of Jaboticabal, State of São Paulo in 1959. After his elementary studies, he took courses in philosophy at the diocesan seminary of São Carlos and theology at the Theological Institute of Campinas. He received a licentiate in moral theology at the Theological Faculty Nossa Senhora da Assunção, São Paulo, and a doctorate in the same discipline at the Alphonsian Academy, Rome.

He was ordained on 14 December 1984 to Mata, the Diocese of São Carlos. As a priest has had the following ministries: Priest in Água Vermelha and Coordinator of the Youth Pastoral of São Carlos (1985–1986) and professor of philosophy at the seminary and the Diocesan Spiritual Director of the House of Theology in Campinas (1986–1987 and 1991); Rector of the Seminary of Philosophy of São Carlos (1987–1988 and 1990), Coordinator of the Diocesan Pastoral Vocation (1987 and 1989), Parochial Vicar of the Cathedral of São Carlos (1988–1989), Parochial Vicar of the Parish Nossa Senhora de Fátima São Carlos (1990), Coordinator of the Diocesan Pastoral and Rector of the Chapel of São Carlos in São Judas Tadeu (1991), Professor of Moral Theology at the PUC Campinas and Rector of the Diocesan Seminary of Theology (1997–2001), member of the formation of permanent deacons, and member of the Council of Priests and the College of Consultants.

On 13 June 2001 he was appointed Titular Bishop of Alba and Auxiliary Bishop of Fortaleza by Pope John Paul II. He was consecrated on 11 August. He was appointed Coadjutor Archbishop of Teresina 31 January 2007 and he became Archbishop there on 3 September 2008.

As Bishop has held the following positions: Member of the Episcopal Commission for Doctrine of the Brazilian Bishops' Conference, and member of the Episcopal Commission of the Happening de Superação from misery and Fome of the Episcopal Conference of the Regional Secretary and in charge of Youth and the Pastoral Care of Vocations Northeast Region 1; Member of the Permanent Council and the Commission of the Doctrine of the Episcopal Conference, President of Northeast Region 1; Chairman of the Department of Vocation and Ministry CELAM – Latin American Episcopal Council.

Rocha was appointed to succeed João Braz de Aviz as Archbishop of Brasilia on 15 June 2011. He took possession of that see on 6 August.

On 14 November 2015, Pope Francis named him as one of his three appointees to the council of the Synod of Bishops.

Pope Francis raised him to the rank of cardinal on 19 November 2016, naming him Cardinal-Priest of Santa Croce in Via Flaminia.

On 11 March 2020, Pope Francis transferred him, naming him Archbishop of São Salvador da Bahia.

On 7 March 2023, Pope Francis appointed him to the Council of Cardinal Advisors.

References

External links
 

1959 births
Living people
21st-century Roman Catholic archbishops in Brazil
Pontifical Lateran University alumni
Brazilian cardinals
Cardinals created by Pope Francis
People from São Paulo (state)
Roman Catholic archbishops of Brasília
Roman Catholic bishops of Fortaleza
Roman Catholic archbishops of Teresina
Roman Catholic archbishops of São Salvador da Bahia